Nicolae Răcean (born 29 November 1963 in Sărmaș) is a Romanian former rugby union player and current coach of Italian side ASD Tuscia.

He played as a centre.

Club career
During his career Răcean played for Romanian clubs Universitatea Cluj and Universitatea Timișoara. He finished his playing career in Italy.

International career
Răcean gathered 39 caps for Romania, from his debut in 1988 to his last game in 1995. He scored 5 tries, 3 penalties and 1 conversion during his international career, 32 points on aggregate. He was a member of his national side for the 2nd and 3rd Rugby World Cups in 1991 and 1995 and played in all 6 group matches and scored a penalty and a conversion against Flying Fijians in Pool 4 match held in Brive-la-Gaillarde, on 12 October 1991.

External links
Nicolae Răcean International Statistics at ESPN
Nicolae Răcean's Profile at It'srugby

References

1963 births
Living people
Romanian rugby union players
Romanian rugby union coaches
Romania international rugby union players
CS Universitatea Cluj-Napoca (rugby union) players
SCM Rugby Timișoara players
Romanian expatriate sportspeople in Italy
Rugby union centres
People from Harghita County